Latifal is a village in Chakwal District, Punjab, Pakistan. It is north of Sikriala and Mangwal, north-east of Dhudial, around 20 km north of Chakwal, and about 70 km south of Islamabad. Latifal lies just below the southern border of District Rawalpindi. The population of Latifal was about 1,800 in 2007.

Geography
Latifal is about 41 kilometres from Chakwal District. There are several ethnic groups in this village. It is home to at least two mosques. Dog fighting is popular amongst elder people, and cricket amongst younger people.

Education
Latifal has at least two primary schools:

Government Girls Primary School Latifal (female only)
Government Primary School Latifal (male only)

References 

Populated places in Chakwal District
Chakwal District